A. P. Hill Boyhood Home is a historic home located at Culpeper, Culpeper County, Virginia, United  States.

History
The original section was built about 1820, and enlarged to its present size about 1860.  It is a three-story, five bay by seven bay, brick building in the Tuscan villa style townhouse.  It was originally three bays deep, but enlarged to seven bays just before the American Civil War.  It was built by Revolutionary War General Edward Stevens, then purchased by the father of General A. P. Hill in 1832.  It housed a dwelling and store.  The Hill family sold the property in 1862.

It was listed on the National Register of Historic Places in 1973.  It is located in the Culpeper Historic District.

References

Houses on the National Register of Historic Places in Virginia
Italianate architecture in Virginia
Houses completed in 1820
Houses in Culpeper County, Virginia
National Register of Historic Places in Culpeper County, Virginia
Individually listed contributing properties to historic districts on the National Register in Virginia